Statistics of L. League in the 2003 season. Tasaki Perule FC won the championship.

First stage

East

West

Second stage

Championship playoff 

 All Teames Stay Division 1 in 2004 Season.

Position playoff 

 Shimizudaihachi SC, JEF United Ichihara Ladies, Renaissance Kumamoto FC Relegated to Division 2 in 2004 Season.

Division 1 Stay/Relegation playoff 

 Ohara Gakuen JaSRA LSC, Takarazuka Bunnys Ladies SC Stay Division 1 in 2004 Season.
 Okayama Yunogo Belle, AS Elfen Sayama FC Relegated to Division 2 in 2004 Season.

League awards

Best player

Top scorers

Best eleven

Best young player

See also 
 Empress's Cup

External links 
  Nadeshiko League Official Site

Nadeshiko League seasons
1
L
Japan
Japan